Ivashkovo is a rural locality (a village) in Vtorovskoye Rural Settlement, Kameshkovsky District, Vladimir Oblast, Russia. The population was 14 as of 2010.

Geography 
Ivashkovo is located 15 km southwest of Kameshkovo (the district's administrative centre) by road. Vysokovo is the nearest rural locality.

References 

Rural localities in Kameshkovsky District